Robert Graydon (1671 – 1725) was an Irish politician.

Graydon sat as a Member of Parliament for Harristown in the Irish House of Commons from 1692 to 1693, and again from 1695 to 1699.

References

1671 births
1725 deaths
Irish MPs 1692–1693
Irish MPs 1695–1699
Members of the Parliament of Ireland (pre-1801) for County Kildare constituencies